is a JR West Hakubi Line station located in Asahi-chō, Takahashi, Okayama, Japan. The Hakubi Line extends as a single track from this station north.

History

1926-06-20: Bitchū-Takahashi Station opened
1987-04-01: Japanese National Railways were privatized, and Bitchū-Takahashi Station became a JR West station
2007-07-03: Bitchū-Takahashi Station were equipped by the ICOCA automated ticket system
2015-04-11: New station building opened
2017-02-04: Takahashi City Complex opened

Station layout

Bitchū-Takahashi Station has three platforms capable of handling four lines simultaneously, equipped by an automated ticket machine, and has an concourse connecting to the two island platforms.

Around the station

Bitchū-Takahashi Station is located about 500m east of the Takahashi River, which is across Japan National Route 180.

Next to the station is the Takahashi City Complex with the Takahashi City Library, Tsutaya Book Store, Starbucks, Tourlist Information Center and the Takahashi Bus Center.

Also in the area are the following:
Takahashi Municipal Office
Bitchū Prefectural Community Center, Takahashi Branch
Takahashi Post Office
Takahashi Sōgō Cultural Arts Center
Takahashi City Bunka Kōryukan
Kibi International University
Okayama Prefectural Takahashi High School
Okayama Prefectural Takahashi Jōnan High School
Takahashi Nisshin High School
Raikyū-ji
Bitchu-Matsuyama Castle
Ishibiya-chō Furusato-mura
Porca Tenmaya Happy Town

Highway access
 Japan National Route 180
 Japan National Route 313
 Japan National Route 484
 Okayama Prefectural Route 196 (Takahashi Teishajō Route)
 Okayama Prefectural Route 302 (Uji-Teppōchō Route)

See also
List of Railway Stations in Japan

External links
 JR West

Hakubi Line
Railway stations in Okayama Prefecture
Railway stations in Japan opened in 1926